Pascoea exarata is a species of beetle in the family Cerambycidae. It was described by Francis Polkinghorne Pascoe in 1862. It is known from Moluccas.

References

Tmesisternini
Beetles described in 1862